The 2012–13 Lipscomb Bisons men's basketball team represented Lipscomb University during the 2012–13 NCAA Division I men's basketball season. The Bisons, led by 14th year head coach Scott Sanderson, played their home games at Allen Arena and were members of the Atlantic Sun Conference. They finished the season 12–18, 7–11 in A-Sun play to finish in ninth place. They lost in the quarterfinals of the Atlantic Sun Basketball tournament to Mercer.

Roster

Schedule
 
|-
!colspan=12 style=| Exhibition

|-
!colspan=12 style=| Non-conference regular season

|-
!colspan=12 style=| Atlantic Sun regular season

|-
!colspan=12 style=| Atlantic Sun tournament

References

Lipscomb Bisons men's basketball seasons
Lipscomb